Skidegate Channel is a strait located in the Haida Gwaii archipelago of British Columbia, Canada.  It divides the archipelago's two main islands, Graham Island to the north and Moresby Island to the south.

Geography
Skidegate Channel is a located between Graham Island to the north, the Pacific Ocean to the west, Skidegate Inlet to the northeast, and Moresby Island to the south. Dawson Inlet branches off to the north from Skidegate Channel near its western terminus at the Pacific Ocean. Trounce Inlet branches off to the north from Skidegate Channel near its midpoint.

References

External links

Landforms of Haida Gwaii
Straits of British Columbia